Zabłocie  is a village in the administrative district of Gmina Markuszów, within Puławy County, Lublin Voivodeship, in eastern Poland.

In 2009, the village had a population of 318.

References

Villages in Puławy County